Sir Nigel John Dermot "Sam" Neill  (born 14 September 1947) is a New Zealand actor. Neill's 53-year career has included leading roles in both dramas and blockbusters. Considered an "international leading man", he has been regarded as one of the most versatile actors of his generation.

Born in Omagh, Northern Ireland, Neill moved to Christchurch with his family in 1954. He first achieved recognition with his appearance in the 1977 film Sleeping Dogs, which he followed with leading roles in My Brilliant Career (1979), Omen III: The Final Conflict, Possession (both 1981), A Cry in the Dark (1988), Dead Calm (1989), The Hunt For Red October (1990),  The Piano (1993) and In the Mouth of Madness (1994). He came to international prominence as Dr. Alan Grant in Jurassic Park (1993), a role that he reprises in Jurassic Park III (2001) and Jurassic World Dominion (2022).

Outside of film, Neill has appeared in numerous television series, including Reilly, Ace of Spies (1983), The Simpsons (1994), Merlin (1998), The Tudors (2007), Crusoe (2008–2010), Happy Town (2010), Alcatraz (2012), Peaky Blinders (2013–2014), and Rick and Morty (2019). He has presented and narrated several documentaries. In 2021, he had a one-episode role on the Apple TV+ sci-fi series Invasion.

Neill is the recipient of the AACTA Award for Best Actor in a Leading Role, the Longford Lyell Award, the New Zealand Film Award and the Logie Award for Most Outstanding Actor. He also has three Golden Globe and two Primetime Emmy Award nominations.

Early life

Northern Ireland
Neill was born on 14 September 1947 in Omagh, County Tyrone, Northern Ireland, to Priscilla Beatrice (née Ingham) and Dermot Neill. His father, an army officer, was a second-generation New Zealander, while his mother was English. His great-grandfather Percival “Percy” Neill left Belfast, in Ireland, for Melbourne joining a firm of merchants. Four years later he moved to New Zealand in 1863, settling in Dunedin. He was the son of a wine merchant importing wine from France.

At the time of Neill's birth, his father was stationed in Northern Ireland, serving with the Royal Irish Fusiliers. His father's family owned Neill and Co. (later part of the listed hospitality group Wilson Neill). Neill identifies primarily as a New Zealander.

New Zealand
In 1954, Neill moved with his family to New Zealand, where he attended the Anglican boys' boarding school Christ's College, Christchurch. He went on to study English literature at the University of Canterbury, where he had his first exposure to acting. He moved to Wellington to continue his tertiary education at Victoria University, where he graduated with a BA in English literature.

In 2004, on the Australian talk show Enough Rope, interviewer Andrew Denton briefly touched on the topic of Neill's stuttering. He recalled how deeply it had affected him in his life, and as a result he often found himself "hoping that people wouldn't talk to [him]" so he would not have to answer. He also stated, "I kind of outgrew it. I can still ... you can still detect me as a stammerer."

He first took to calling himself "Sam" at school because there were several other students named Nigel, and because he felt the name Nigel was "a little effete for ... a New Zealand playground".

Acting career

New Zealand

Neil's first film was a New Zealand television film The City of No (1971). He followed it with a short, The Water Cycle (1972) and the television film Hunt's Duffer (1973). Neill wrote and directed a film for the New Zealand National Film Unit, Telephone Etiquette (1974). He also appeared in Landfall (1975).

Neill's breakthrough performance in New Zealand was the film Sleeping Dogs (1977), the first local film to be widely screened abroad.

Australia
Neill went to Australia where he had a guest role on the TV show The Sullivans. He was the romantic male lead in My Brilliant Career (1979), opposite Judy Davis, which was a big international success.

He made some Australian films that were less widely seen: The Journalist (1979), Just Out of Reach (1979) and Attack Force Z (1981), and appeared in television productions such as Young Ramsay and Lucinda Brayford.

International career

In 1981, he won his first big international role, as Damien Thorn, son of the devil, in Omen III: The Final Conflict; also in that year, he played an outstanding main role in Andrzej Żuławski's cult film Possession.

Ivanhoe (1982 film) made Neill a local celebrity in Sweden, where it has been aired on SVT every New Years Day for 40 years.

He was one of the leading candidates to succeed Roger Moore in the role of James Bond, but lost out to Timothy Dalton. Among his many Australian roles is playing Michael Chamberlain in Evil Angels (1988) (released as A Cry in the Dark outside of Australia and New Zealand), a film about the case of Azaria Chamberlain.

Neill has played heroes and occasionally villains in a succession of film and television dramas and comedies. In the UK, he won early fame and was Golden Globe nominated after portraying real-life spy, Sidney Reilly, in the mini-series Reilly, Ace of Spies (1983). An early American starring role was in 1987's Amerika, playing a senior KGB officer leading the occupation and division of a defeated United States. His leading and co-starring roles in films include the thriller Dead Calm (1989), the two-part historical epic La Révolution française (1989) (as Marquis de Lafayette), The Hunt for Red October (1990), Death in Brunswick (1990), Jurassic Park (1993), Sirens (1994), The Jungle Book (1994), John Carpenter's In the Mouth of Madness (1995), Event Horizon (1997), Bicentennial Man (1999), the comedy The Dish (2000), and Jurassic Park III (2001).

Neill has occasionally acted in New Zealand films, including The Piano (1993), Perfect Strangers (2003),  Under the Mountain (2009), and Hunt for the Wilderpeople (2016). He returned to directing in 1995 with the documentary Cinema of Unease: A Personal Journey by Sam Neill (1995) which he wrote and directed with Judy Rymer.

In 1993, he co-starred with Anne Archer in Question of Faith, an independent drama based on a true story about one woman's fight to beat cancer and have a baby. In 2000, he provided the voice of Sam Sawnoff in The Magic Pudding. In 2001, he hosted and narrated a documentary series for the BBC entitled Space (Hyperspace in the United States).

He portrayed the eponymous wizard in Merlin (1998), a miniseries based on the legends of King Arthur. He reprised his role in the sequel, Merlin's Apprentice (2006).

Neill starred in the historical drama The Tudors, playing Cardinal Thomas Wolsey. "I have to say I really enjoyed making The Tudors", he said, "It was six months with a character that I found immensely intriguing, with a cast that I liked very much and with a story I found very compelling. It has elements that are hard to beat: revenge and betrayal, lust and treason, all the things that make for good stories."

He acted in the short-lived Fox TV series Alcatraz (2012) as Emerson Hauser. He played the role of Otto Luger in the fantasy adventure film The Adventurer: The Curse of the Midas Box (2014). He had a role in the BBC series Peaky Blinders, set in post-World War I Birmingham. He played the role of Chief Inspector Chester Campbell, a sadistic corrupt policeman, who came to clean up the town on Churchill's orders. In the 2015 BBC TV miniseries And Then There Were None, based on Agatha Christie's thriller, he played the role of General MacArthur.

In 2016, he starred in the New Zealand-made film, Hunt for the Wilderpeople, directed by Taika Waititi, as well as the ITV miniseries Tutankhamun. In 2017, Neill appeared in a scene in Waititi's fantasy sequel Thor: Ragnarok, in which he portrays an actor playing Odin (as depicted by Anthony Hopkins), alongside Luke Hemsworth and Matt Damon as actors playing Thor and Loki, respectively. He portrays the same actor in Thor: Love and Thunder in 2022.

In 2018, he portrayed Mr. McGregor and also provided the voice of Tommy Brock, in Peter Rabbit. In 2019, he was cast for the role of Denis Goldberg in Escape from Pretoria; however, the role was subsequently recast with Ian Hart. In late 2019, he was announced to reprise his character of Dr. Alan Grant in Jurassic World Dominion, which released in July 2022.

Personal life
In 1980, Neill met actress Lisa Harrow while filming Omen III: The Final Conflict (1981) and the two have a son. Neill subsequently married make-up artist Noriko Watanabe in 1989 and they have one daughter together. He also adopted Watanabe's daughter from her first marriage. Neill separated from Watanabe in 2017, and as of early 2018 was reportedly dating Australian political journalist Laura Tingle.

In his early twenties, Neill fathered a son who was placed for adoption. They reunited in 1994.

Neill lives in Alexandra, New Zealand, South Island, and owns a winery called Two Paddocks, consisting of a vineyard at Gibbston and two near Alexandra, all in the Central Otago wine region. His avocation is running Two Paddocks. "I'd like the vineyard to support me but I'm afraid it is the other way round. It is not a very economic business", said Neill, "It is a ridiculously time- and money-consuming business. I would not do it if it was not so satisfying and fun, and it gets me pissed once in a while." He enjoys sharing his exploits on the farm through social media. He names his farm animals after film-industry colleagues.

Neill supports the New Zealand Labour Party and the Australian Labor Party. He has been a member of the Equity New Zealand trade union since 1979.

In March 2023, Neill revealed that he had been undergoing chemotherapy after being diagnosed with stage 3 angioimmunoblastic T-cell lymphoma, a type of blood cancer, following swollen glands that were first noticed during publicity for Jurassic World Dominion. The cancer is in remission according to Neill, but he will require ongoing chemotherapy for the rest of his life.

Honours and awards
Neill was appointed an Officer of the Order of the British Empire in the 1991 Queen's Birthday Honours, for services as an actor. In the 2007 New Year Honours, he was appointed a Distinguished Companion of the New Zealand Order of Merit (DCNZM). When knighthoods were returned to the New Zealand royal honours system in 2009, those with DCNZM or higher honours were given the option of converting them into knighthoods. Neill chose not to do this, saying the title of Sir was "just far too grand, by far". However, in June 2022, he accepted redesignation as a Knight Companion of the New Zealand Order of Merit, granting him the title Sir.

Neill was awarded an honorary Doctor of Letters degree by the University of Canterbury in 2002. Neill was awarded the 2019 Equity New Zealand Lifetime achievement award, celebrating his distinguished performance career, as well as his leadership and mentoring towards others in the acting industry. In 2020, he received an Arts Foundation of New Zealand Icon Award, limited to 20 living people.

Filmography

Film

Television

Video Games

Books

See also
 List of celebrities who own wineries and vineyards

References

External links

 
 
 

1947 births
1970s in New Zealand cinema
20th-century male actors from Northern Ireland
20th-century New Zealand male actors
20th-century New Zealand male writers
21st-century male actors from Northern Ireland
21st-century New Zealand male actors
21st-century New Zealand male writers
Actors awarded knighthoods
Audiobook narrators
Best Actor AACTA Award winners
British male film actors
Critics of religions
Knights Companion of the New Zealand Order of Merit
Living people
Logie Award winners
New Zealand documentary filmmakers
New Zealand expatriates in Australia
New Zealand male voice actors
New Zealand male television actors
New Zealand male film actors
New Zealand people of English descent
New Zealand Officers of the Order of the British Empire
New Zealand screenwriters
New Zealand television producers
New Zealand winemakers
Northern Ireland emigrants to New Zealand
People educated at Christ's College, Christchurch
People educated at Medbury School
People from Northern Ireland of English descent
People from Northern Ireland of New Zealand descent
People from Omagh
People from Queenstown, New Zealand
University of Canterbury alumni
Victoria University of Wellington alumni